Porth is a crater on the planet Mars. It is named after the town of Porth, Rhondda Cynon Taff, south Wales, United Kingdom. It is located at 21.4°N, 255.9°W and has a diameter of 9.3 kilometers.

References 

Impact craters on Mars
Amenthes quadrangle